Márcia Malsar (born 1957 or 1958) is a retired Brazilian Paralympic sprinter. In 1984, she became the first Brazilian athlete ever to win a Paralympic gold medal.  She won three more medals at the 1984 and 1988 Paralympics and competed in 1992. Malsar carried the Paralympic torch during the opening ceremony of the 2016 Paralympic Games in Rio de Janeiro.

References

External links

 

1950s births
Living people
Paralympic athletes of Brazil
Paralympic gold medalists for Brazil
Paralympic silver medalists for Brazil
Paralympic bronze medalists for Brazil
Paralympic medalists in athletics (track and field)
Athletes (track and field) at the 1984 Summer Paralympics
Athletes (track and field) at the 1988 Summer Paralympics
Athletes (track and field) at the 1992 Summer Paralympics
Medalists at the 1984 Summer Paralympics
Medalists at the 1988 Summer Paralympics
Brazilian female sprinters
20th-century Brazilian women